The naval Battle of Chesme took place on 5–7 July 1770 during the Russo-Turkish War (1768–1774) near and in Çeşme (Chesme or Chesma) Bay, in the area between the western tip of Anatolia and the island of Chios, which was the site of a number of past naval battles between the Ottoman Empire and the Republic of Venice. It was a part of the Orlov Revolt of 1770, a precursor to the later Greek War of Independence (1821–1829), and the first of a number of disastrous fleet battles for the Ottomans against Russia.

Prelude
The Russo-Turkish War had begun in 1768, and Russia sent several squadrons from the Baltic Sea to the Mediterranean Sea to draw Ottoman attention away from their Black Sea fleet, then only six ships of the line strong. Two Russian squadrons, commanded by Admiral Grigory Spiridov and Rear Admiral John Elphinstone, a British adviser, combined under the overall command of Count Alexei Orlov, Commander-in-Chief of the Russian Fleet, and went to look for the Ottoman fleet.

On 5 July 1770, they came across it, anchored in line just north of Çeşme Bay, western Anatolia. The Ottoman fleet contained about 14 ships of the line, perhaps 6 frigates, 6 xebecs, 13 galleys and 32 small craft, with about 1,300 guns in total. About 10 of the ships of the line, of 70–100 guns, were in the Ottoman main line with a further 6 or so in the second, arranged so that they could fire through the gaps in the first line. Behind that were the frigates, xebecs, etc. The fleet was commanded by Kapudan Pasha Mandalzade Hüsameddin, in the fourth ship from the front (north end) of the line, with Hasan Pasha in the first ship, Real Mustafa, and Cafer Bey in the seventh. Two further ships of the line, probably small, had left this fleet for Mytilene the previous evening.

After settling on a plan of attack, the Russian battle line (see Table 1) sailed towards the south end of the Ottoman line and then turned north, coming alongside the Ottomans, with the tail end coming into action last (Elphinstone had wanted to approach the northern end first, then follow the wind along the Ottoman line, attacking their ships one by one – the method used by Nelson at the Battle of the Nile in 1798).

Battle
The Ottomans opened fire at about 11:45 a.m., followed by the Russians slightly later. Three of the Russian ships of the line had trouble staying in position; Evropa turned around and came back behind Rostislav, Tri Svyatitelya circled the second Ottoman vessel before coming back into the Russian line, being attacked in error by Tri Ierarcha as she did so, and Sviatoi Ianuarii turned around before coming back into the line.

Spiridov, in Sviatoi Evstafii, had a close-range battle with Hasan Pasha in Real Mustafa, before the latter was suddenly seen to be on fire. Her mainmast came down and landed on Sviatoi Evstafii deck, causing the Russian ship to blow up immediately. Shortly thereafter, Real Mustafa blew up as well.

According to Elphinstone, who claimed the Russians were almost useless, Spiridov and Count Feodor Orlov (brother of the commander), had left Sviatoi Evstafii before the fighting became close-range. Spiridov ended up on Tri Svyatitelya. Sviatoi Evstafii'''s captain, Kruse, survived too. At about 2:00 p.m. the fighting ended, as the Ottomans cut their cables and moved south into the bay, forming themselves into a defensive line of eight ships of the line, a second line, and the rest beyond.

On 6 July, the Russians bombarded the Ottoman ships and land positions. At about 12:30 a.m. on the morning of  7 July, Orlov sent Samuel Greig (who transferred to Rostislav) to attack with Evropa, Rostislav and Ne tron menya forming a south–north line facing the Ottomans, and with Saratov in reserve, Nadezhda attacking the batteries at the eastern side of the bay entrance, Afrika attacking the batteries on the western side, and Grom near Afrika. At about 1:30 a.m. or earlier (times were about 90 minutes earlier, according to Elphinstone), fire from Grom and/or Ne tron menya caused an Ottoman ship of the line to blow up after her main topsail caught fire, and the fire quickly spread to other ships of the line. By 2:00 a.m., two Ottoman ships of the line had blown up and more were on fire, and Greig sent in three fireships (the fourth, seeing the danger, stayed out), which contributed in a small way to the burning of almost the entire Ottoman fleet. At about 4:00 a.m., boats were sent in to save two ships of the line which were not burning, but one of these caught fire while it was being towed. The other, Semend-i Bahri 60, survived and was captured along with five galleys. Fighting ended at about 8:00 a.m. Russian casualties on 5 July were 14 killed, plus 636 killed in Sviatoi Evstafii, and about 30 wounded, and on 7 July 11 killed. Ottoman casualties were much higher. Hüsameddin, Hasan Pasha and Cafer Bey survived. Hüsameddin was removed from his position, which was given to Cafer Bey. This was the only significant fleet battle during the Russo-Turkish War.

Significance

The Battle of Chesme was fought on the same day as the land Battle of Larga. It was the greatest naval defeat suffered by Ottomans since the Battle of Lepanto (1571). This battle inspired great confidence in the Russian fleet and allowed the Russians to control the Aegean Sea for some time. The defeat of the Ottoman fleet also speeded up rebellions by minority groups in the Ottoman Empire, especially the Orthodox Christian nations in the Balkan peninsula, who helped the Russian army in defeating the Ottoman Empire.

After this naval victory, the Russian fleet stayed in the Aegean for the following five years. It returned to Çeşme twice more during this time to bombard it. Historians still debate the rationale for the Russian military focus on this small fort town while there were many other more strategic targets along the Aegean coast.

Due to the Ottoman defeat, fanatical Muslim groups proceeded to massacre c. 1,500 local Greeks in nearby Smyrna.

Catherine the Great commissioned four monuments to commemorate the victory: Chesma Palace and Church of Saint John at Chesme Palace in St Petersburg (1774–77), Chesma Obelisk in Gatchina (1775), and Chesma Column in Tsarskoe Selo (1778).

See also
Timeline of Ottoman history
Action of 27 May 1770
Action of 6 November 1772
Action of 4 July 1773
Action of 3 September 1773
Action of 20 June 1774

Notes

References

İsipek, Ali Rıza ve Oğuz Aydemir (2006) 1770 Çeşme Deniz Savaşı: 1768–1774 Osmanlı-Rus Savaşları, Istanbul:Denizler Kitabevi,  
Isipek Ali Rıza and Aydemir Oguz (2010) Battle of Çesme 1770. 1768–1774 Ottoman–Russian Wars, Istanbul, Denizler Kitabevi, 

Further reading
Baş, Ersan: Çeşme, Navarin, Sinop Baskınları ve Sonuçları'' [Çeşme, Navarino, Sinop Raids and the Results]. Türk Deniz Harp Tarihinde İz Bırakan Gemiler, Olaylar ve Şahıslar. Piri Reis Araştırma Merkezi Yayını, Sayı: 8. İstanbul 2007, Deniz Basımevi,

External links
Istanbul Naval Museum official website

Chesma
Chesma 1770
Chesma 1770
Chesma 1770
History of İzmir Province
History of the Aegean Sea
1770 in the Ottoman Empire
Çeşme